The Squeaker is a 1930 British mystery crime film directed by Edgar Wallace and starring Percy Marmont, Anne Grey and Gordon Harker.

It was shot at Beaconsfield Studios. The film was adapted by Wallace from his own 1927 novel The Squeaker. It was one of several films based on Wallace's novels made by the British Lion Film company during the era. Wallace's son, Bryan Edgar Wallace, reportedly edited the film.

Cast
 Percy Marmont as Captain Leslie 
 Anne Grey as Beryl Stedman 
 Gordon Harker as Bill Annerley 
 Trilby Clark as Millie Trent 
 Alfred Drayton as Lew Friedman 
 Eric Maturin as Frank Sutton 
 Nigel Bruce as Collie 
 W. Cronin Wilson as Inspector

See also
 The Squeaker (1931)
 The Squeaker (1937)
 The Squeaker (1963)

References

Bibliography
Low, Rachael. Filmmaking in 1930s Britain. George Allen & Unwin, 1985.
Wood, Linda. British Films, 1927–1939. British Film Institute, 1986.

External links
 

1930 films
1930 crime films
British crime films
Films set in London
Films shot at Beaconsfield Studios
British Lion Films films
British mystery films
1930 mystery films
1930s English-language films
1930s British films